IED may refer to:

Devices
 Improvised explosive device, an explosive device often used in unconventional warfare
 Instantaneous electrical detonator, used to trigger an explosive device
 Intelligent electronic device, in the electric power industry
 Implantable electronic device, pacemaker

Dictionaries
 Indo-European Etymological Dictionary
 Indogermanisches etymologisches Wörterbuch (Indo-European Etymological Dictionary), by Julius Pokorny
 Interlingua–English Dictionary, the first major presentation of Interlingua to the public

Healthcare
 Inter-ictal epileptiform discharge, a characteristic of epileptic seizures
 Intermittent explosive disorder, a mental health disorder
 Intestinal epithelial dysplasia, another name for congenital tufting enteropathy

Organizations
 Information Engineering Directorate, Information Technology Directorate of the UK Department of Trade and Industry
 Institute for Educational Development, at Aga Khan University
 Institute of Economic Development
 Institution of Engineering Designers, in the UK
 Istituto Europeo di Design, European Institute of Design
 NASU Institute of Electrodynamics, a research institute in Kyiv

Other uses
 Industrial Emissions Directive, a European Union directive
 Infliction of Emotional Distress, a tort cause of action, falling under intentional torts